The 122nd edition of the Durand Cup began on 11 September at the Dr. Ambedkar Stadium, Delhi. Nine I-League teams were scheduled to take part. The qualifiers were held starting on 2 September, with the final on 20 September. Two teams from the qualifier joined to make it a 12 team battle in the quarterfinals.

Participating teams included reigning champions Mahindra United, Churchill Brothers SC, Army XI, Sporting Clube de Goa, Air India FC, Dempo SC, JCT FC and newly promoted Shillong Lajong FC. Mohun Bagan AC and East Bengal FC had not been part of the Durand Cup in previous years, but according to DFTS Secretary General Major S.S. Maan, they were expected to participate.

Qualifying round one

16 teams played a one-off match to determine the 8 clubs to reach the second qualifying round.

Qualifying round two

8 teams play a one-off match to determine 4 clubs to advance to the third qualifying stage.

Qualifying round Three

4 clubs remain, 2 will advance to the Group Stage

Group stages

Tables & Results

Group A

Group B

Group C

Group D

Semi-finals

Final

2009
Dur
2009 domestic association football cups